Perenniporia fraxinophila is a species of fungus in the family Polyporaceae. It is a plant pathogen infecting ash trees.

References

Fungi described in 1882
Fungi of North America
Fungal tree pathogens and diseases
Perenniporia
Taxa named by Charles Horton Peck